LZ2 may refer to the following:

 Zeppelin LZ2, an early model of a type of rigid airship
 LZ2 (algorithm), a lossless data compression algorithm
 Led Zeppelin II, the second album by the band Led Zeppelin
 LZ2 (Lanzarote), a road in the Canary Islands
 Landing Zone 2, SpaceX landing pad on the Space Coast, Florida, USA
 Panasonic Lumix DMC-LZ2, a digital camera